The Murder of Betty Shanks is one of the oldest and most notorious unsolved murder cases in Queensland, Australia.

Overview
On the night of 19 September 1952, 22-year-old Betty Shanks got off a tram at Days Road Terminus in Grange, a suburb of Brisbane, Queensland, after attending classes in the city and started her short walk home. Her violently beaten body was found in the garden of a house on the corner of Carberry and Thomas Streets the next morning at 5:35 AM, by a policeman who lived nearby. At the time it was Queensland's biggest criminal investigation ever, and  a reward of A$50,000 is still current.

Investigation
An attack by a sex offender was considered very early in the investigation. Another theory is that the murderer attacked the wrong woman, and was actually interested in a doctor's receptionist – who also walked home down the same street at the same time, and had keys to the surgery which contained drugs. A number of people have confessed over the years, however all have proven to be false.

Related works

Books
Several books have been written about the murder and the authors have outlined who they believe the murderer to be. These works include:
Who Killed Betty Shanks? (2006 (revised in 2012), author: Ken Blanch) Blanch suggested that Shanks was killed by a soldier.
"I Know Who Killed Betty Shanks" (First edition 2014; Second edition 2019; Third edition 2022; author: Ted Duhs) Duhs theorized that Eric Sterry killed Shanks.
The Thomas St Affair (2016, author: Lyle Reed) Reed proposed that Shanks was killed by a police officer riding a motorbike. The author did not reveal the killer's name in interviews prior to the book being published but did indicate he was a member of his family.

Film
The Wilston Murder: The story of Betty Shanks (2012) This documentary was produced and directed by student filmmakers Maya Weidner and Becky Newman, respectively, as a university project. The women believed the story was one that could resonate with a modern-day audience. Newman recalled learning about the murder at a young age, as her family was interested in history and had read Ken Blanch's book, Who Killed Betty Shanks? but believed the story was largely forgotten among her generation.

See also

List of unsolved murders

References

1950s in Brisbane
1950s in Queensland
1952 murders in Australia
Australian murder victims
Deaths by person in Australia
Female murder victims
Murder in Queensland
People murdered in Queensland
September 1952 events in Australia
Unsolved murders in Australia